Probable phospholipid-transporting ATPase IIA is a protein that in humans is encoded by the ATP9A  gene.

References

Further reading